Meredith Ann Patterson (born November 24, 1975) is an American musical theatre and television actress. She is best known for her Broadway performances such as Peggy Sawyer in 2001 Revival of "42nd Street", The Boy Friend and White Christmas, as well as her television and film work.

Early life 
Meredith Ann Patterson was born on November 24, 1975, in Concord, California. She is the youngest of four children. She graduated from College Park High School in 1993. She toured the country at 17 as a teacher for The Universal Dance Association. At the age of 18, Patterson relocated to New York City to pursue a career as a dancer on Broadway.

Filmography

References

External links
 
 

1975 births
American film actresses
American musical theatre actresses
American tap dancers
American television actresses
Living people
People from Concord, California
Actresses from California
21st-century American actresses